The IEEE Charles Proteus Steinmetz Award is a technical field award given to an individual by the Institute of Electrical and Electronics Engineers (IEEE), for major contributions to standardization within the field of electrical and electronics engineering. This IEEE-level award, which honors Charles Proteus Steinmetz, was created in 1979 by the board of directors of the IEEE and sponsored by the IEEE Standards Association.

The award is given only to individual recipients (not groups or multiple individuals in a single year).

Recipients of this award receive a bronze medal, a certificate, and an honorarium.

Recipients 
The following people have received the IEEE Charles Proteus Steinmetz Award:

 2021: Haran C. Karmaker
 2020: Solveig M. Ward
 2019: Innocent Kamwa
 2018: Craig M. Wellman
 2017: David John Law
 2016: Hermann Koch
 2015: Steven Mills
 2014: Mark Mcgranaghan
 2013: Mohindar Sachdev
 2012: Daleep C. Mohla
 2011: James W. Moore
 2010: Richard Deblasio
 2009: James Thomas Carlo
 2008: Roy Billinton
 2007: Vic Hayes
 2006: Steven Mark Halpin
 2005: Wallace S. Read
 2004: Julian Forster
 2003: Donald C. Loughry
 2002: Ben C. Johnson
 2001: Stanley Baron
 2000: Hiroshi Yasuda
 1999: Dennis Bodson
 1998: William J. McNutt
 1997: L. John Rankine
 1997: Donald N. Heirman
 1996: Marco W. Migliaro
 1995: L. Bruce McClung
 1994: Clayton H. Griffin
 1993: Ivan G. Easton
 1992: Donald C. Fleckenstein
 1991: Fletcher J. Buckley
 1990: Warren H. Cook
 1989: Joseph L. Koepfinger
 1988: No Award
 1987: Bruce B. Barrow
 1986: Chester H. Page
 1985: Charles L. Wagner
 1984: H. Baron Whitaker
 1983: William A. McAdams
 1982: Ralph M. Showers
 1981: No Award
 1980: Leon Podolsky

References 

Charles Proteus Steinmetz Award